Michael Robert Henderson (born 31 March 1956) is an English former football player, coach and manager. Primarily a defender, Henderson also played professionally in midfield, and spent most of his professional career in England's Football League.

Starting his career as a schoolboy at Sunderland, Henderson played a part in their promotion to the First Division in 1976, before transferring to Watford in 1979 for £120,000. He made 67 appearances for Watford in all competitions, but was a backup to Pat Rice during Watford's 1981–82 promotion to the First Division. At the end of that season, he joined Cardiff City, and later played for Sheffield United and Chesterfield. Towards the end of his time at Chesterfield, Henderson player-coached and briefly managed the team.] Following his retirement from football, Henderson became a police officer.

References

1956 births
Living people
People from Gosforth
Footballers from Tyne and Wear
Association football defenders
Association football midfielders
Sunderland A.F.C. players
Watford F.C. players
Cardiff City F.C. players
Sheffield United F.C. players
Chesterfield F.C. players
Chesterfield F.C. managers
Matlock Town F.C. players
English Football League players
British police officers
English footballers
English football managers